Chiraprapha was a queen regnant of the Kingdom of Lan Na. She was the 12th monarch of Lan Na. She was the grandmother of King Setthathirath of Lan Xang. Chiraprapha was the daughter of Phra Chao Setarat and Phra Nang Pathumkhappha, king and queen of Setanakhon.

References

Rulers of Chiang Mai
People from Luang Prabang
Queens regnant in Asia
16th-century women rulers